Javier Peregrina (born 21 May 1932) is a Mexican former sports shooter. He competed in the 50 metre pistol event at the 1968 Summer Olympics.

References

1932 births
Living people
Mexican male sport shooters
Olympic shooters of Mexico
Shooters at the 1968 Summer Olympics
People from Guadalajara, Jalisco
Pan American Games medalists in shooting
Pan American Games silver medalists for Mexico
Pan American Games bronze medalists for Mexico
Shooters at the 1967 Pan American Games
20th-century Mexican people